Issuu, Inc. (pronounced "issue") is a Danish-founded American electronic publishing platform based in Palo Alto, California, United States.

Founded in 2004 as a Danish startup, the company moved its headquarters to the United States in 2013.

Purpose 
Issuu converts PDFs into digital publications that can be shared via links or embedded into websites. Users can edit their publications by customizing the design, using templates, or adding links and multimedia to the pages of their documents. Issuu also provides tools for measuring and monetization of content.

History
Issuu was founded in Copenhagen, Denmark, in 2006 by Michael and Rubyn Bjerg Hansen, Mikkel Jensen, and Martin Ferro-Thomsen.

By 2011, Issuu software was used by several online publications.

In early 2013, the company opened an office in Palo Alto, California and appointed CEO Joe Hyrkin, formerly of Reverb, Trinity Ventures, and Yahoo!, to helm its Silicon Valley operations. The company soon moved its headquarters to the Palo Alto location. Upon the move, the founders of Issuu stated that they chose the city as they saw social media and digital distribution partnerships as the key to its growth, rather than focusing mostly on publishing relationships.

In 2014, the company released Clip, a tool that allowed readers to take a snapshot of any part of a publication and share that on social media or through email.

Apps
In 2014 Issuu released its iOS app to access Issuu on Apple devices. The app included an offline reading list function that allowed users to read from the Issuu app without being online. The app could also stack publications back to back so that they could be read in succession. Initially, the app was released on Android in January. Previous to the launch of the company's 2014 apps, Apple had rejected an app from Issuu three times during 2009 (before the company expanded into the US). In 2019, Issuu announced the launch of Issuu Promote, an ad integration tool for Facebook and Instagram, allowing for content to be distributed across multiple social media channels.

Recognition
In 2009, Issuu was named one of Time's 50 Best Websites.

See also
 Docstoc

References

Further reading

External links
 

Online companies of Denmark
File sharing
Internet properties established in 2006
Online publishing companies of the United States
Companies based in Palo Alto, California
Danish companies established in 2006